Ever since its early days Hunslet has been the 'Workshop of Leeds'. Although from the Industrial Revolution onwards there have been other areas in Leeds to have a large industrial base, such as Holbeck, Armley, Kirkstall and Harehills, none so much as Hunslet. Like neighbouring Holbeck, Hunslet benefited from its close proximity with the River Aire, Leeds city centre, coal mining communities to the south, extensive railways and some of Leeds' best infrastructure. From the 1960s onwards the motorways would also drive industry and commerce in Hunslet.

Hunslet grew from an unremarkable area at the beginning of the Industrial Revolution to a major industrial area only a few years later. The growing industries in Hunslet were not the textile industries, for which Leeds was becoming best known, but generally heavier industries such as steel and iron foundries, engine works and railway works.

1906 
By 1906, Hunslet was home to Leeds’ second largest gas works, the city's main rail goods yards, known at the time as ‘Midland Goods Station’ (now the site of Crown Point Retail Park), as well as a large number of factories, below is a rough inventory of the major industrial premises in Hunslet at the time.
 Joshua Tetley and Son's Brewery - South Brook Street/ Crown Point Lane
 Sun Foundry - Dewsbury Road
 Potterdale Mill - Dewsbury Road
 Well House Foundry - Dewsbury Road
 Oil Works - Dewsbury Road
 Malthouse and Maltkiln- Dewsbury Road
 Railway Works - Butterley Street
 Printing Works - Butterley Street
 Union Mills - Holmes Street
 Leeds Corporation Refuse Destructor - Kidacre Street
 Malthouse - Gold Street
 Stafford Pottery (disused) - Leathley Road
 Crown Point Printing Works - Hunslet Road
 Boyne Engine Works - Jack Lane
 Hunslet Engine Works - Jack Lane/Cancel Street
 Steam Plough and Locomotive Works - Hunslet Road/ Leathley Road
 Airedale Foundry (Iron and Steel) - Hunslet Road/ Grape Street/ Pearson Street
 Railway Foundry (Iron) - Jack Lane
 Midland Engine Works - Jack Lane
 St Helen's Mills - Whitehouse Street
 Brush Works - Glasshouse Street
 Larchfield Engineering Works - Hunslet Road
 Larchfield Woollen Mills - Pym Street
 Hunslet Glass Works - South Accommodation Road
 Goodman Street Works (Iron and Steel) - Goodman Street
 Lock Works - South Accommodation Road
 Aire Bank Mills - South Accommodation Road
 Airedale Chemical Manure Works - Clarence Road
 Dolphin Foundry (Iron) - Sayner Road
 Hunslet Nail Works - Atkinson Street
 Victoria Mills - Goodman Street
 Hunslet Linen Works - Goodman Street
 Nevin's Foundry - Goodman Street
 Malthouse - Larchfield Road
 Progress Works (Mineral Water) - Stafford Street
 Albert Tool Works - Donisthorpe Street
 Yorkshire Steel Foundry - Black Bull Street
 Victoria Chemical Works - Clarence Road
 Providence Works - Cudbear Street
 Saw Mills - Cudbear Street
 Iron Works - Crown Point Road
 Union Foundry (Iron) - Brookefield Street
 Airedale Works - Albury Road
 Globe Mills (Cabinet Works) - Chadwick Street
 New Dock Wagon Works - Black Bull Street
 Bowman Lane Dye Works - Crown Point Road
 Leather Works - Hunslet Lane

Hunslet was home to Leeds' second largest gasworks, the site had a large column guided gasholder, which was replaced in the 1960s by two spiral guided gasholders (which still stand). The site no longer produces town gas, storing natural gas instead.

1960s 

In 1968, a widespread slum clearance project led to the construction of the Hunslet Grange Flats, also informally known as the Leek Street Flats. The 2,500 flats were commissioned by Leeds City Council and constructed by Shepherd Building Group. The flats were built as a large complex, sprawling over much of Hunslet. While the flats enjoyed a degree of popularity in their first few years, this did not last, the layout of the complex and severe condensation lead to them being attributed to many health and social problems in the area, and only 13 years after construction began, in 1983, the council began to demolish the complex.

The 1960s also saw the M1 motorway come to Hunslet, since the rerouting of the M1 around the East of Leeds taking it to the A1(M) motorway at Aberford, the Hunslet stretch of the former M1 is now part of the M621.

1980s 
Following the demolition of Hunslet Grange, the area was again redeveloped with low rise council housing in the early 1990s.

2000s 
The 2000s saw the redevelopment of the former industrial area surrounding Clarence Dock.

Future
The proposed HS2 railway line will run through Hunslet adjacent to the Leeds to Pontefract railway line on a new viaduct. It was at one time planned to terminate at Leeds New Lane station to the west of Hunslet, but will now terminate at Leeds station.

See also 
History of Leeds
History of Seacroft
History of Wetherby

References 

Hunslet History of